Dzalisi is a historic village in Georgia, located in the Mukhrani valley, 50 km northwest of Tbilisi, and 20 km northwest of Mtskheta.

It is the Zalissa of Ptolemy (AD 90–168) who mentions it as one of principal towns of Iberia, an ancient Georgian kingdom (Geographia; § 10, 3). Archaeological digs have revealed the remains of four palaces and hypocaustic baths, acropolis, swimming pool, administrative part, barracks for soldiers, water supply system and burial grounds. One of the villas is notable for its floor mosaics, which, together with the mosaics of Pityus, are, by far, the oldest ones found in the Caucasus. The style of the mosaic dates to around AD 300. Its central part depicts Ariadne and Dionysus in a banquet scene.

References 
 Manana Dzumberovna Odiseli, edited by Renate Pillinger and Barbara Zimmermann. Spätanike und frühchristliche Mosaike in Georgien. (Osterreichischen Akademie der Wissenschaften 1995).  
 
 Kakha Khimshiashvili. Temples and Palaces in the Ancient Georgia: Interpretation difficulties in the Context of the Near Eastern Archaeology (Summary). Open.ge. Accessed September 22, 2007.

Archaeological sites in Georgia (country)